Prvoslav Dragićević (Serbian Cyrillic: Првослав Дpaгићeвић, March 4, 1914 – December 27, 1974) was a Serbian football manager and former player.

Playing career

Club career
Dragićević played at SK Jedinstvo Beograd and BSK Beograd from 1936 to 1941 as a midfielder, and he was part of the memorable midfield line formed with Petar Manola and Gustav Lechner. The team won the Yugoslav First League in 1939. During his career he also played with Belgrade clubs Jedinstvo and Radnički and with FK Dinamo Pančevo where he finished his playing career in 1948.

International career
He has played six matches for the national team from 1939 to 1940. After the Germans invaded Yugoslavia in 1941, he left the country.

Managing career

Željezničar Sarajevo
He coached FK Željezničar Sarajevo in the 1954-55 season. Although the team secured only 11th place, it sufficed to save them from relegation.

Olympiacos
In 1956, he went to Greece to coach Olympiacos F.C. The team won the double in the 1956-57 season. The league was won after a long run which ended with Olympiacos winning a play-off match against eternal rivals Panathinaikos F.C. in the neutral Nikos Goumas Stadium (1-0). In the cup, Olympiacos beat AEK Athens 1-0 in the quarter-finals with a goal by Babis Kotridis, and once again Panathinaikos (1-0) in the semi-finals. The team concluded by winning Iraklis FC 2-0 in the final and celebrated the first of three consecutive doubles (1957, 1958, 1959) that still remains a record for Greek teams. Dragičević left the club in 1960 after a successful period in Olympiacos.

Honours

Player

Club
BSK Belgrade
Yugoslav Championship: 1938–39

Manager
Olympiacos
Super League: 1956–57, 1957–58, 1958–59
Greek Cup: 1956–57, 1957–58, 1958–59, 1959–60

References

External sources
 

1914 births
1974 deaths
Sportspeople from Kragujevac
Serbian footballers
Yugoslav footballers
Yugoslavia international footballers
Association football midfielders
SK Jedinstvo Beograd players
OFK Beograd players
FK Radnički Beograd players
FK Dinamo Pančevo players
Yugoslav First League players
Serbian football managers
Yugoslav football managers
Olympiacos F.C. managers
FK Željezničar Sarajevo managers